The Kyushu Palookas football program represents the Kyushu University in college football. They are members of the Kyūshū Collegiate American Football Association.

References

External links
 

American football in Japan